The Perth SuperSprint is an annual motor racing event for Supercars, held at Wanneroo Raceway in Wanneroo, Western Australia. The event has been a regular part of the Supercars Championship and its predecessor, the Australian Touring Car Championship, since 1973.

The event returned in 2022 after not being held in 2020 and 2021 due to the COVID-19 pandemic.

Format
The event is staged over a two-day weekend, from Saturday to Sunday. One single ninety-minute practice session is held on Saturday, then a three-stage knockout qualifying session which decides the grid positions for the following 100 kilometre race. Two separated ten-minute qualifying sessions are held on Sunday, which decide the grid for the following 100 km races.

History
Wanneroo Park Raceway, as it was then known, hosted its first round of the Australian Touring Car Championship (ATCC) in 1973, with Allan Moffat taking the first of his three event victories over Peter Brock. It was the first ATCC event ever held in Western Australia and featured the only appearance of a Subaru in the history of the ATCC. The championship did not return to Wanneroo until 1978. The event that year consisted of two heats and the Holden Dealer Team scored a rare 1-2-3 finish in the overall results, with Brock taking victory, from 12th on the grid, over team-mates John Harvey and Wayne Negus. Allan Grice won the event in 1980 and 1982 despite only completing partial championship campaigns in each year.

During practice for the 1983 event, Moffat found that his Mazda RX-7 struggled on the rises in the circuit compared to the other cars. To compensate for this, he started the race with the petrol tank only half-filled and made a pit stop during the race. The strategy worked and Moffat took victory, despite almost colliding with Brock when the latter spun in the closing stages. Moffat's Mazda won again in 1984, the final win for the four-time champion. Under Group A regulations, from 1985 to 1992, the event was dominated by Nissan Skylines and Ford Sierras, with Gibson Motorsport's Nissans taking three wins and Fords of Dick Johnson Racing and Mobil 1 Racing taking four combined. This included Mark Skaife took his first ATCC round victory in the 1991 event for Nissan. Ahead of the 1993 event, the circuit was renamed from Wanneroo Park to Barbagallo Raceway due to a sponsorship from Alf Barbagallo, a name which remained until 2020. Alan Jones won the 1994 round on the same weekend that he was fined for throwing a punch at an official.

The Holden Racing Team controlled the event from 1996 to 2000, taking victory in all five years. Craig Lowndes won all twelve races across the 1996, 1998, 1999 and 2000 events having missed the 1997 event as he was racing overseas. Brock took his final ATCC round victory in that 1997 weekend despite not winning any of the races during the event. Paul Radisich interrupted the Holden Racing Team's success in 2001, winning for Dick Johnson Racing in a dominant weekend that saw him take pole, lead every lap and secure three fastest laps across the three races. In 2002, Jason Bright returned the Holden team to the top step of the podium. Bright won again in 2004 for Paul Weel Racing, before Steven Richards won consecutive events at the circuit in 2005 and 2006 despite only winning one of the six races in the two years. In the second race of the 2005 event, Skaife and Marcos Ambrose, who had started together on the front row, both ended up in the gravel trap at the first turn of the race. While Skaife retired, Ambrose managed to drive out and finished fifth despite a drive-through penalty being issued during the race, before he was then given a further points penalty post-race for the same incident.

In this period, discussions were held about moving the event to a street circuit in Perth, and Barbagallo dropped off the 2010 calendar due to dated facilities. The Government of Western Australia resisted moving the event and Barbagallo was instead upgraded, with the circuit returning to the calendar in 2011 and a new pit and paddock complex being built for 2012. The 2011 event saw one of the biggest accidents in the history of the championship take place. Karl Reindler, 13th on the grid, stalled at the start and was hit by Steve Owen, who had started 25th and was travelling at 150 km/h. The impact ruptured the fuel tank in Reindler's car, engulfing both cars in flames. Reindler suffered superficial burns to his hands and face as well as smoke inhalation, while Owen escaped serious injury. In the same race, Jason Bright took the first championship victory for Brad Jones Racing, the team that also prepared Reindler's entry.

Lowndes took his 91st career race victory in the ATCC and Supercars Championship during the 2013 event, breaking Skaife's previous record of 90. In 2014, Scott McLaughlin gave Volvo its first race victory in its return to the series, having last competed in 1986. Lowndes took his 16th and final Barbagallo race win in the Saturday race in 2016, opting to make an additional pitstop to most other cars and moving up from 22nd at pit exit to take the victory. The two other Triple Eight Race Engineering entries of Shane van Gisbergen and Jamie Whincup completed the podium in a repeat of the Holden Dealer Team feat of 1978. From 2017 to 2019, McLaughlin won three consecutive events, including winning the Sunday race in 2018 from 19th on the grid, a record at the circuit.

The event was reformatted in 2019 to become a SuperNight event with races on Friday and Saturday night for the first time at the circuit. The 2020 event, again due to be held at night, was postponed indefinitely due to the COVID-19 pandemic. The event was later rescheduled to the end of October, however as a daylight event, before being cancelled altogether in August 2020. The 2021 event suffered the same fate and was again cancelled.

Winners

Multiple winners

By driver

By team

By manufacturer

Notes
  – DJR Team Penske was known as Dick Johnson Racing from 1980 to 2014, hence their statistics are combined.
  – Holden Dealer Team was known as Mobil 1 Racing from 1988 to 1990, hence their statistics are combined.

Event names and sponsors
 1973, 1978–80, 1984–85, 1987–92: Wanneroo
 1981: Saab-Scania Trophy
 1982: Walpamur Cup
 1983: Saab-Scania Cup
 1986: Motorcraft 100
 1993–2001, 2004: Barbagallo
 2002–03: VB 300
 2005, 2014: Perth 400
 2006: Perth V8 400
 2007–08: BigPond 400
 2009: BigPond 300
 2011–12: Trading Post Perth Challenge
 2013: Chill Perth 360
 2015: Ubet Perth Super Sprint
 2016–18, 2023–: Perth SuperSprint
 2019: Pirtek Perth SuperNight
 2022: Bunnings Trade Perth SuperNight

See also
 List of Australian Touring Car Championship races

References

Recurring sporting events established in 1973
Supercars Championship races
Wanneroo Raceway
Sport in Perth, Western Australia
Motorsport in Western Australia